Rineloricaria kronei is a species of catfish in the family Loricariidae. It is native to South America, where it occurs in the Ribeira de Iguape River basin in Brazil. The species is believed to be a facultative air-breather.

References 

Fish described in 1911
Catfish of South America
Fish of Brazil
Loricariini